Dan Sabin Anca (7 January 1947 – 20 October 2005) was a Romanian football midfielder and manager for Universitatea Cluj.

Club career
Dan Anca was born on 7 January 1947 in Turda, Romania, starting to play football in 1959 at local club, Chimia. He went to play for Universitatea Cluj, a team which he would spent all of his senior career, making his Divizia A debut under coach Andrei Sepci on 8 November 1964 in a 3–1 home loss in front of CSMS Iași and at the end of the season the club won the 1964–65 Cupa României, however he was not used by Sepci in the 2–1 victory from the final against Argeș Pitești. He scored his first goals for the club in the 1967–68 season, scoring the only goal of a victory against Steagul Roșu Brașov, one goal in a 2–0 victory in front of Dinamo Bacău and his team's goal in a 1–1 in front of Steaua București on the Ghencea stadium. Anca played 30 games and scored 7 goals in the 1971–72 season, helping The Red Caps finish on the 3rd position in the championship which earned the team a spot in the 1972–73 UEFA Cup where he played in the both matches from the first round as Levski Sofia defeated them with 6–5 on aggregate. At the end of the 1975–76 season, the team relegated to Divizia B but Anca stayed with the club, helping it obtain promotion back to the first league after three years, making his last Divizia A appearance on 11 November 1979 in a 2–0 away loss in front of FC Baia Mare, having a total of 318 matches with 25 goals scored in the competition.

International career
Dan Anca appeared at international level in 7 matches for Romania, making his debut on 15 January 1969 under coach Angelo Niculescu in a friendly which ended 1–1 against England played on the Wembley Stadium from London where he had a appreciated performance, his direct opponent being Bobby Charlton. He also played two games at the Euro 1972 qualifiers and one at the 1974 World Cup qualifiers, his last appearance being a friendly which took place on 18 April 1973 and ended with a 2–0 away loss in front of Soviet Union.

Managerial career
As his playing career, Dan Anca spent his entire managerial career at Universitatea Cluj, he started at the end of the 1979–80 Divizia A season when he worked as Gheorghe Staicu's assistant, also guiding the team together the whole following season. In the middle of the 1988–89 Divizia A season he worked again as a assistant, this time with Cornel Dinu as head coach and in the following season he replaced Dinu after the 9th round, leading the team as head coach until the 20th round when he was replaced with Ștefan Sameș. He worked on a few other occasions as head coach at "U" Cluj, his last spell taking place in the 2002–03 Divizia B season, having a total of 112 matches led as a manager in the Romanian top-division, Divizia A consisting of 35 victories, 22 draws and 55 losses. Anca died on 20 October 2005 at age 58 in his native Turda and the multi-use stadium, Baza Sportivă Dan Anca from Cluj-Napoca was named after him.

Honours

Player
Universitatea Cluj
Cupa României: 1964–65
Divizia B: 1978–79

References

External links

1947 births
2005 deaths
Romanian footballers
Romania international footballers
Association football defenders
Liga I players
Liga II players
FC Universitatea Cluj players
Romanian football managers
FC Universitatea Cluj managers
People from Turda